Paul Higgins (8 March 1946 – 15 February 2016) was an Australian rules footballer who played for the South Melbourne Football Club in the Victorian Football League (VFL).

Higgins was a detective with Victorian Police.  In 1987 he was arrested and charged with corruption.  In one of Australia's longest and most expensive trials, he was found guilty and sentenced to seven years in jail.

Notes

External links 

1946 births
2016 deaths
Australian rules footballers from Victoria (Australia)
Sydney Swans players
Australian police officers
Criminals from Melbourne